Puannum of Kish was the sixth Sumerian king in the First Dynasty of Kish, according to the Sumerian king list. Puannum is unlikely to have existed as his name does not appear on texts dating from the period in which he was presumed to have lived (Early Dynastic period).

References 

|-

Kings of Kish
Sumerian kings